The Samburu Project (TSP) is a 501(c)(3) non-profit organization based in Los Angeles, California, founded on the promise of delivering access to clean water to the Samburu pastoralist community in northern Kenya. Since its inception, the Samburu Project has drilled 137 wells, that currently provide water to over 100,000 Samburu individuals. The organization is recognized as both a Non-Governmental Organization (NGO) and a Community Based Organization (CBO) in Kenya.

History and governing structure 
The Samburu Project was founded in the Fall of 2005 by Kristen Kosinski, a former television executive at Paramount Pictures.  during a trip to Kenya. Along with respected Samburu elder, Mama Musa, she was inspired to start the organization as a vehicle for women's empowerment. After ten years, Ms. Kosinski resigned the position as executive director. In February 2016, former board chair Linda Hooper assumed directorship, and the office was relocated to its current location in the historic Helms Bakery Complex in Culver City.  

As of 2020, the organization has a staff of three in Los Angeles, and a staff of five at their Wamba office in Samburu county, Kenya. A diverse Board of Directors is composed of 11 individuals in the US. The organization also has an active internship program open to high school and college students. 

With 137 wells providing clean water, The Samburu Project has expanded its program to support women with empowerment workshops, teenage girls with menstrual hygiene products and reproductive health information, and gardening workshops as a way to expand food insecurity, food diversity, and income generation. 

The Samburu Project is supported by foundation grants, personal donations, events, peer-to-peer fundraising events, and corporate partnerships.

Media coverage 
The Los Angeles Times featured the work of the Samburu Project in an article by Iris Schneider in November 2016 that chronicled the daily life of a village called Ntilal. A companion article appeared in LA Observed on December 8, 2016.

References

Non-profit organizations based in California
Samburu County
Organisations based in Kenya